Type-in traffic is a term describing visitors landing at a web site by entering a keyword or phrase (with no spaces or in place of a space) in the web browser's address bar (and adding .com or any other gTLD or ccTLD extension); rather than following a hyperlink from another web page, using a browser bookmark, or a search-box search. Type-in traffic is a form of direct navigation.

History

This behavior changed as browsers evolved based on the 'default search engine' setting in the web browser's properties. Thus entering 'mysearchterm' in the address bar would now lead to an error page, as the computer is looking  or to results from a search engine if a default is set. Much of Microsoft's Bing (formerly as MSN then Windows Live Search) high usage rank results from the error page traffic delivered via their dominant Internet Explorer browser. A significant percentage of Google's traffic originates from redirects via the Firefox and Google Chrome browsers and from the Google toolbar, all of which take over type-in traffic search strings to the browser address bar.

In the last few years, advertisers, publishers and ad networks such as MSN, AOL, Google and Yahoo have been displaying relevant advertising to highly targeted type-in traffic from domain names, browser address bar searches and error traffic.

 In November 2004 Marchex acquired the generic domain name portfolio of Name Development Ltd., a little-known British Virgin Islands company, for 164 million dollars, predominantly for its 100,000+ domain name portfolio generating 17 million type-in traffic visitors each month.
 In 2005, Highland Capital and Summit Partners, two venture capital firms, acquired a controlling interest in BuyDomains, paying an undisclosed sum for its domain name portfolio.
 In August 2005, industry trade journals such as dnjournal, dnforum and domainstate reported that sale volumes and prices of existing generic domain-names were rising rapidly as a result of type-in traffic monetization opportunities.  Small webmasters can buy a domain name with type-in traffic and utilize Google's AdSense product, or any of several traffic aggregators to display relevant advertising to the trickle of visitors coming to their domain names. Many small publishers are generating thousands of dollars each month in revenue with very little effort by building websites that serve relevant advertising to their type-in traffic visitors.
 In April 2006 DemandMedia.com purchased the domain name registrar eNom as a tool for acquiring type-in traffic and for a portfolio of thousands of type-in traffic domain names. In July 2006 Demand Media purchased Bulkregister.com, another top ten ICANN accredited registrar.
 In May 2006 iREIT acquired Netster.com, predominantly for the thousands of generic type-in domain name names contained within the broader Netster domain name portfolio.
 Google's entry into the small publisher monetization space came as a result of their purchase of Applied Semantics (oingo.com) in 2003. The drop registrar phenomenon is directly related to the value and desirability of type-in traffic domain names.
 Type-in traffic does not differentiate between trademark traffic and generic traffic as it relates to domain names.  For example, the act of registering  for one's own commercial gain would be considered cybersquatting. However, the act of registering  or  would likely be a defensible acquisition of a generic domain name for type-in traffic generation or resale business opportunities. Many companies have begun to actually buy backlinks from type-in traffic sites in an effort to capture more unique visitors from reasonably targeted networks.

References